The Kubert School, formerly the Joe Kubert School of Cartoon and Graphic Art and Joe Kubert School, is a private, for-profit technical school focused on cartooning and located in Dover, New Jersey. It teaches the principles of sequential art and the particular craft of the comics industry as well as commercial illustration. It is the only accredited school devoted entirely to cartooning.

The school's instructors are full-time professionals working in the industry, many of them graduates of the school themselves, and the instruction is hands-on and practical. The school has a reputation for demanding and intensive coursework. Its alumni include Ed Piskor, Amanda Conner, Lee Weeks, Andy Price, George McClements, and Alex Maleev, as well as many other comics pencilers and inkers.

History 
The Joe Kubert School of Cartoon and Graphic Art was founded in September 1976 by cartoonist Joe Kubert and his wife Muriel in Dover's former high school, whose tall windows offered optimal lighting. Its first graduating class of 1978 included Stephen R. Bissette, Thomas Yeates, and Rick Veitch.

Founder and teacher Kubert kept his own studio in the school, later joined by his sons Adam and Andy, who are also comic book professionals and who teach at the school.

Campus and student body

The two official student houses are the Carriage House and Mansion, at the former site of the school on Lehigh Street, in Dover. The school houses the Kubert Art Store, which sells art supplies needed for assignments, such as books and drafting tables.

There are usually no more than 150 students attending the school at any time. As well as regular weekday classes, the school also holds a weekly class every Saturday, which is available for people who are not enrolled in the main program. The class is on basic lessons in cartooning, and is taught by Fernando Ruiz and Fabio Redivo.

The school attracts students from countries such as Japan and Malaysia, in addition to students from the local area. Kubert expressed the school's philosophy in a 2003 profile:

References

External links

 

1976 establishments in New Jersey
Art schools in New Jersey
Comics-related organizations
Dover, New Jersey
Educational institutions established in 1976
Universities and colleges in Morris County, New Jersey
Private universities and colleges in New Jersey